USS Smartt (DE-257) was an  of the United States Navy during World War II. She took part in operations in the Atlantic Ocean to protect convoys and other ships from German submarines and fighter aircraft. She performed escort and antisubmarine operations in battle areas before sailing home at the end of the conflict.

Namesake
Joseph G. Smartt was born on 19 March 1917 in Austin, Texas. He enlisted in the United States Naval Reserve on 8 October 1940. He attended elimination flight training at Robertson, Missouri, and was appointed an aviation cadet on 28 January 1941. He completed aviation training at Naval Air Station, Pensacola, Florida, and was promoted to Ensign on 17 September 1941.

He was assigned to Patrol Squadron 11 at Naval Air Station, Kaneohe Bay, Oahu, Hawaii and was killed in action on 7 December 1941 during the Japanese Attack on Pearl Harbor. He was posthumously commended by the Commander in Chief, Pacific Fleet, for his efforts to repel the attack on the air station.

Construction and commissioning
She was laid down on 10 January 1943 by the Boston Navy Yard, Boston, Massachusetts; launched on 22 February 1943; sponsored by Mrs. W. H. Thomson; and commissioned on 18 June 1943.

World War II North Atlantic operations 
Smartt fitted out at Boston and sailed on 6 July to Bermuda, B.W.L., for her shakedown cruise which lasted until 7 August when she returned for yard availability. She steamed to Norfolk, Virginia, on the 23rd and, four days later, departed that port with a convoy bound for North Africa. The convoy passed through the Straits of Gibraltar on 13 September, and the merchant ships were turned over to British control. The convoy reformed on the 17th and sailed for Brooklyn, New York, arriving on 5 October. Between 25 October 1943 and 20 April 1944, Smartt escorted three convoys from New York to Casablanca and back.

Convoy Under German Air Attack  
On 23 April, Smartt sailed from Norfolk with Escort Division 5 as escort for convoy UGS-40 en route to the Mediterranean. The convoy was attacked near Algiers on 11 May by German dive-bombers. The escorts laid a smoke screen, and Smartt took three Ju 88's under fire, observing hits on all three. A second wave of three came in on the port quarter, near the water. One of these was splashed approximately 2,000 yards from the escort. In the third wave of the attack, two planes came along the ship's starboard side, and she picked them up out of the smoke at approximately 1,500 yards. Her gunners splashed one, and the other was smoking profusely as it passed out of range. The convoy continued to Bizerte, Tunisia, and arrived on 13 May. Smartt joined convoy. GUS-40, consisting of 65 ships, the following week and returned to New York.

End-of-War operations 
Between 4 July 1944 and 14 June 1945, Smartt made six convoy escort voyages from the United States to the Mediterranean and return. When the escort returned to New York with its last convoy, it remained there until 10 July for upkeep. The escort moved to Casco Bay, Maine, and conducted local operations there from 18 July to 10 September when she returned to New York for inactivation.

Post-War Decommissioning  
Smartt was placed out of commission, in reserve, on 5 October. She was struck from the Navy List on 24 October 1945 and sold for scrap on 12 July 1946.

Awards  
Smartt received one battle star for World War II service.

References

External links
 

Evarts-class destroyer escorts
Ships built in Boston
1943 ships
World War II frigates and destroyer escorts of the United States